Hiltrud Breyer (born 22 August 1957) is a German politician and former Member of the European Parliament with the German Green Party, part of the European Greens and sits on the European Parliament's Committee on Women's Rights and Gender Equality and its Committee on the Environment, Public Health and Food Safety.

She is a substitute for the Committee on Legal Affairs, substitute for the Delegation to the EU-Romania Joint Parliamentary Committee.

Education
 Studied political science in Saarbrücken and Berlin
 Founding member of the Greens
 posts include Regional Executive Spokeswoman for the Greens in Saarland
 Former Member of the Mandelbachtal Municipal Council

Career
 1989–2009: Member of the European Parliament
 Founding member of 'Gen-ethisches Netzwerk' (genetic ethics network)

Controversy
In 2008, German television station RTL reported about members of the European Parliament—including Breyer—who signed the attendance register on Friday mornings to receive the EP's daily allowance of 284 Euro before leaving Strasbourg immediately for the weekend. Breyer later denied these allegations.

See also
 2004 European Parliament election in Germany

References

External links
 
 

1957 births
Living people
Alliance 90/The Greens MEPs
MEPs for Germany 1989–1994
MEPs for Germany 1994–1999
MEPs for Germany 1999–2004
MEPs for Germany 2004–2009
20th-century women MEPs for Germany
21st-century women MEPs for Germany